Delontae Scott (born January 21, 1997) is an American football defensive end and outside linebacker for the San Antonio Brahmas of the XFL. He played college football at SMU.

College career
Scott was a member of the SMU Mustangs for five seasons, redshirting as a true freshman. As a redshirt senior, he had 10 sacks, 18 tackles for loss, and three forced fumbles and was named second-team All-American Athletic Conference. Scott finished his collegiate career with 97 tackles, 36 tackles for loss, 18 sacks and five forced fumbles in 40 games played.

Professional career

Green Bay Packers
Scott signed with the Green Bay Packers as an undrafted free agent on April 29, 2020. He was waived on September 5, 2020, and was signed to the practice squad the following day. Scott was placed on the practice squad injured list on December 15, 2020. He was signed to a reserve/futures contract with the Packers on January 25, 2021. Scott was waived on August 31, 2021, at the end of training camp.

Pittsburgh Steelers
Scott was signed to the Pittsburgh Steelers' practice squad on September 7, 2021. He was elevated to the active roster on November 21, 2021, for the team's Week 11 game against the Los Angeles Chargers. He signed a reserve/future contract with the Steelers on January 18, 2022.

On August 30, 2022, Scott was waived by the Steelers and re-signed to the practice squad. On September 27, 2022, he was released.

Carolina Panthers
On October 18, 2022, Scott was signed to the Carolina Panthers practice squad. He was released on November 7, 2022.

San Antonio Brahmas
The San Antonio Brahmas selected Scott in the fourth round of the 2023 XFL Supplemental Draft on January 1, 2023.

References

External links
SMU Mustangs bio
Pittsburgh Steelers bio

1997 births
Living people
American football linebackers
Green Bay Packers players
Pittsburgh Steelers players
SMU Mustangs football players
Players of American football from Texas
Carolina Panthers players
San Antonio Brahmas players